Sergey Malyshev (born 5 March 1976) is a Russian Paralympic shooter from Balashov who won a silver medal at the 2008 and 2012 Summer Paralympics, and also represented the nation at the 1996 and 2020 Summer Paralympics.

Awards 
 Medal of the Order "For Merit to the Fatherland" II class (30 September 2009) 
 Medal of the Order "For Merit to the Fatherland" I class (10 September 2012)
 Russian Federation Presidential Certificate of Honour (19 September 2016)

References

1976 births
Living people
Russian male sport shooters
Paralympic shooters of Russia
Paralympic silver medalists for Russia
Paralympic bronze medalists for the Russian Paralympic Committee athletes
Paralympic medalists in shooting
Shooters at the 1996 Summer Paralympics
Shooters at the 2008 Summer Paralympics
Medalists at the 2008 Summer Paralympics
Shooters at the 2012 Summer Paralympics
Medalists at the 2012 Summer Paralympics
Shooters at the 2020 Summer Paralympics
People from Balashov
Recipients of the Medal of the Order "For Merit to the Fatherland" I class
Recipients of the Medal of the Order "For Merit to the Fatherland" II class
Sportspeople from Saratov Oblast
21st-century Russian people